The Nashville Municipal Auditorium is an indoor sports and concert venue in Nashville, Tennessee. It opened October 7, 1962 with both an arena and exhibition hall. The former exhibition hall has been permanent home to the Musicians Hall of Fame and Museum since 2013.

Nashville Municipal Auditorium was previously home to various teams, most notably the Belmont Bruins of the National Collegiate Athletic Association from 2001 to 2003. The venue has hosted major events including the CMA Awards (1967), Volunteer Jam (1976–1985), WrestleWar (1989), No Holds Barred: The Match/The Movie (1989), Starrcade (1994–1996), In Your House (1995), U.S. Figure Skating Championships (1997), SuperBrawl (2001). Slammiversary (2007), Lockdown (2012), CMT Music Awards (2022) and Ric Flair's Last Match (2022).

History

Construction

Designed by Marr & Holman and constructed by Nashville Bridge Company in 1962 at a cost of $5 million, the venue was the first public assembly hall in the Mid South with air conditioning.

The venue was built on the site of Bijou Amusement Company’s former Bijou Theatre as part of an urban renewal plan. Bijou Theatre was frequented by African American audiences prior to desegregation.

The structure contains a 306-foot diameter bowl with a spherically curved, clear-span roof. Within the facility is an underground exhibition hall and an arena with two tiers of spectator stands.

Opening and reception

The first event at the venue was a Church of Christ revival on October 7, 1962. The week-long revival from October 7–14 drew more than 90,000 people.

Alterations

The walls of the upper and lower concourses are decorated with enlarged ticket stubs from events and concerts the venue hosted between 1962 and 2010.

$3.2 million in renovations were completed in 2017 to satisfy venue promoter Live Nation, including modernized seating and dressing room areas.

Notable events

Basketball
The venue was home court for the NCAA Belmont Bruins basketball teams from 2001 to 2003 while Striplin Gym was demolished to make way for Curb Event Center.

The venue hosted the Ohio Valley Conference basketball tournament in 1989, 1994, 1995, 1996, 2008, 2011, 2012, 2013, 2014, 2015, 2016 and 2017.

It currently hosts the annual Magnet Madness basketball game between rivals Hume-Fogg High School and Martin Luther King Magnet.

Professional wrestling

The venue hosted the NWA's inaugural WrestleWar event, WrestleWar '89: Music City Showdown, which featured the Pro Wrestling Illustrated Match of the Year between Ric Flair and Ricky Steamboat.

It hosted WWF's No Holds Barred: The Match/The Movie pay-per-view special in December 1989, WWF's SummerSlam Spectacular broadcast in August 1992, as well as WWF In Your House 2: The Lumberjacks in 1995.

The venue hosted WCW's Starrcade 1994, Starrcade 1995, Starrcade 1996, Clash of the Champions XXXV in 1997, and SuperBrawl Revenge in 2001.

Masato Tanaka won his only ECW Heavyweight Championship by defeating Mike Awesome at the venue during an ECW on TNN taping in December 1999.

Total Nonstop Action Wrestling held their first events at the venue in June 2002 before moving to Tennessee State Fairgrounds. The venue also hosted TNA Wrestling's Slammiversary 2007 and Lockdown 2012.

The venue hosted Ring of Honor Wrestling television tapings between 2016 and 2020, and AEW Dynamite broadcasts between 2019 and 2022.

Ric Flair's Last Match took place at the venue in July 2022.

Other sports

The venue hosted the 1994 Coca-Cola National Gymnastics Championships.

The Professional Bull Riders sponsored Bud Light Cup events at the venue from its inception in 1994 until 2001. In 2002, the event was moved to Bridgestone Arena.

The venue hosted the 1997 U.S. Figure Skating Championships.

The venue hosted Tuff Hedeman Championship Bull Riding All Star Shootout on June 10, 2009.

Strikeforce Challengers: Woodley vs. Saffiedine took place at the venue on January 7, 2011.

Concerts

In 1967, the auditorium hosted the Country Music Association's first CMA Awards event, before the ceremonies moved to the Ryman Auditorium the following year.

The 3rd GMA Dove Awards were held at the venue on October 9, 1971.

David Bowie's performance of the venue on November 30, 1974, was released in part on I'm Only Dancing (The Soul Tour 74).

Charlie Daniels Band staged their annual Volunteer Jam concerts at the venue from 1976 to 1985.

Ted Nugent's July 1977 performance at the venue was released in part on Double Live Gonzo!.

The Grateful Dead's April 22, 1978 concert at the venue was released as the live album Dave's Picks Volume 15.

Auditions for Season 2 (2003), Season 14 (2015), and Season 18 (2020) of American Idol were held at the venue. Eventual Season 2 winner Ruben Studdard was discovered at the 2003 audition.

The 35th GMA Dove Awards were held at the venue on April 28, 2004.

Due to the damage at Grand Ole Opry House because of the May 2010 Tennessee floods, the venue hosted the June 8, 2010 edition of the Grand Ole Opry.

The 29th Stellar Awards were held at the venue on January 18, 2014.

Carrie Underwood filmed the video for her song "Cry Pretty" at the venue in 2018.

The 2022 CMT Music Awards were held at the venue on April 11, 2022.

Political events

President Donald Trump appeared on March 15, 2017, for a rally and speech. According to a public address announcement in the venue, thousands more were unable to attend leaving empty seats in the upper level. This announcement was highly controversial as there was no evidence the upper level tickets were ever sold.

Special features

Musicians' Hall of Fame and Museum
On June 4, 2013, the auditorium began housing the Musicians Hall of Fame and Museum within its exhibition hall. The museum was relocated from Music City Center due to construction.

References

External links

 
Nashville Municipal Auditorium Concert List 1963–1999

American Basketball Association (2000–present) venues
Basketball venues in Tennessee
Belmont Bruins men's basketball
College basketball venues in the United States
Gymnastics venues in the United States
Indoor arenas in Tennessee
Indoor ice hockey venues in the United States
Music venues in Tennessee
Sports venues in Nashville, Tennessee
Sports venues completed in 1962
1962 establishments in Tennessee